Keller House may refer to:

in the United States
(by state then city)
Keller House and Derick, Paris, Idaho, listed on the National Register of Historic Places (NRHP) in Bear Lake County
Edward H. and Bertha R. Keller House, Portland, Oregon, listed on the NRHP in Multnomah County
Jacob Keller Farm, Ephrata, Pennsylvania, listed on the NRHP in Lancaster County
Keller House (Hazleton, Pennsylvania), formerly listed on the NRHP in Luzerne County
Keller-Grunder House, Cuero, Texas, listed on the NRHP in DeWitt County
Keller House (Houston, Texas), listed on the NRHP in Harris County
Stoner-Keller House and Mill, Strasburg, Virginia, listed on the NRHP in Shenandoah County
Keller House (Colville, Washington), listed on the NRHP in Stevens County

See also
Keller Site (disambiguation)